The 2016 GT3 Le Mans Cup, known as the 2016 Michelin GT3 Le Mans Cup under sponsorship, was the inaugural season of the GT3 Le Mans Cup. It began on 15 May at the Autodromo Enzo e Dino Ferrari and finished on 23 October at the Autódromo do Estoril. The series was open to grand tourer sports cars in the GT3 class.

Calendar
The provisional 2016 calendar was announced at 16 December 2015. All rounds supported the European Le Mans Series (excepting Silverstone) and 24 Hours of Le Mans.

Entry list

The full season was open to GT3 class cars.

Race results

Driver's championships (top-5)

Teams Championship (top-5)

References

External links
 

GT3 Le Mans Cup
GT3 Le Mans Cup